The 2000 UEFA Champions League final was a football match that took place on 24 May 2000. The match was played at Stade de France in Saint-Denis, France, to determine the winner of the 1999–2000 UEFA Champions League. The final pitted Spanish teams Real Madrid and Valencia. It was the first time in the Champions League or the European Cup that two clubs from the same country competed in the final.

Route to the final

Match

Summary
The match saw a headed goal from Fernando Morientes and a spectacular Steve McManaman volley put Real Madrid 2–0 ahead, before Raúl sealed the win with a breakaway third goal, rounding Santiago Cañizares after Real had cleared a Valencia corner.

The win was Real's eighth European Cup Championship overall and their second in three years, and was notable for being Vicente del Bosque's first title as manager. It was also a landmark for being the first final played between two teams from the same nation. Upon this win, McManaman became the first English player to win the tournament with a non-English club.

Details

Statistics

Source: UEFA Champions League Final 2000 Full-Time Report

See also
1999–2000 UEFA Champions League
1999–2000 Real Madrid CF season
1999–2000 Valencia CF season
Real Madrid CF in international football competitions
Spanish football clubs in international competitions
Valencia CF in European football

References

External links
1999–2000 UEFA Champions League at UEFA.com

European Cup Final 2000
UEFA Champions League finals
European Cup Final 2000
2000
Final
Champions
Champions
UEFA Champions League final
UEFA Champions League final